Carey Lake Airport  is a private airport located  west of Carey Lake, Ontario, Canada.

References

External links
Page about this airport on COPA's Places to Fly airport directory

Registered aerodromes in Ontario
Transport in Thunder Bay District